Ivan Alekseyevich Bartolomei (28 November 1813 – 5 October 1870) was an Imperial Russian military officer, antiquarian, and writer.

Biography 
Bartolomei was born in St. Petersburg in the family of a Russian army general, originally of the Livonian noble family of von Bartholomäi. He took part in the Caucasus War and the Crimean War. In 1853, he led a mission to bring the mountaineers of Free Svanetia under Russian suzerainty. He was promoted to lieutenant-general in 1865. Beyond his service as an Imperial general and bureaucrat, Bartolomei was interested in the peoples and cultures of the Caucasus. He collected Georgian, Bactrian, Parthian, and Sasanian coins, which he subsequently donated to the Hermitage Museum. He authored several studies on the Caucasian ethnography and linguistics and first attempts at creating Abkhaz and Chechen primers. He died in Tiflis in 1870.

References 

1813 births
1870 deaths
Imperial Russian Army generals
Russian military personnel of the Caucasian War
Russian military personnel of the Crimean War
Explorers of the Caucasus
Russian nobility